Artsruni (Armenian: Արծրունի; also transliterated as Ardzruni), an ancient Armenian noble family.

Artsruni / Ardzruni is a common Armenian surname and may refer to:

Gagik Artsruni or Gagik I of Vaspurakan (c. 879 – c. 936/943), Artsruni ruler of Vaspurakan in southern Armenia, first as prince of northwestern Vaspurakan (Gagik III, 904–908) and after that until his death as king, claiming also the title of "King of Armenia" from the Bagratid line
Gagik Apumrvan Artsruni (or Abu Morvan), Armenian prince of the Artsruni line
Grigor Artsruni (1845-1892), Armenian journalist, critic, writer and public activist
Mariam Artsruni, or Mariam of Vaspurakan, daughter of John-Senekerim Artsruni, an Armenian king of Vaspurakan, and the first consort of the king George I of Georgia
Meruzhan Artzruni, Nakharar, Armenian feudal lord who ruled c. 355-369  
Tovma Artsruni, 9th-century to 10th-century Armenian historian 
Vahan Artsruni (born 1965), Armenian rock musician, singer, composer and artist
Şahan Arzruni, Armenian classical pianist, composer

Armenian-language surnames